Hella Philips is an Austrian retired slalom canoeist who competed in the mid-to-late 1950s. She won a bronze medal in the folding K-1 team event at the 1957 ICF Canoe Slalom World Championships in Augsburg.

References

Austrian female canoeists
Possibly living people
Year of birth missing (living people)
Medalists at the ICF Canoe Slalom World Championships